The Toronto Argonauts won the Grey Cup for the second time in five years.

Canadian Football News in 1937
The Quebec Rugby Football Union (QRFU) stopped challenging for the Grey Cup.

Regular season

Final regular season standings
Note: GP = Games Played, W = Wins, L = Losses, T = Ties, PF = Points For, PA = Points Against, Pts = Points

(*) Final Hamilton-Balmy Beach game was cancelled.
*Bold text means that they have clinched the playoffs.

Grey Cup playoffs
Note: All dates in 1937

Division semifinals

Regina wins the series 24-12 and advances to the WIFU finals

Toronto won the total-point series by 21–16. Toronto will play the Sarnia Imperials (ORFU Champions) in the Eastern Finals.

Sarnia advances to the Eastern Final.

Finals

Winnipeg won the total-point series by 19–14. Winnipeg advances to the Grey Cup game.

Toronto advances to the Grey Cup game.

Playoff bracket

Grey Cup Championship

Note: Eastern Final Playoff date is not confirmed, however since the regular season in the East ended November 13, and all other playoff dates, as well as Grey Cup date are accurate, it is reasonable to assume the above date is accurate.

1937 Eastern (Combined IRFU & ORFU) All-Stars 
NOTE: During this time most players played both ways, so the All-Star selections do not distinguish between some offensive and defensive positions.

1st Team
QB – Arnie Morrison, Ottawa Rough Riders
FW – Ormond Beach, Sarnia Imperials
HB – Johnny Ferraro, Montreal Indians
HB – Hugh Sterling, Sarnia Imperials
HB – Stan O'Neil, Ottawa Rough Riders
E  – Wes Cutler, Toronto Argonauts
E  – Jimmy Simpson, Hamilton Tigers
C  – Dave Ryan, Montreal Indians
G – Charles "Tiny" Hermann, Ottawa Rough Riders
G – Tim Palmer, Toronto Argonauts
T – Dave Sprague, Ottawa Rough Riders
T – Mike Clawson, Sarnia Imperials

2nd Team
QB – Alex Hayes, Sarnia Imperials
FW – Ted Morris, Toronto Argonauts
HB – Hugh "Huck" Welch, Hamilton Tigers
HB – Abe Eliowitz, Montreal Indians
HB – Bob Isbister, Toronto Argonauts
E  – Bernie Thornton, Queen's University
E  – Syd Reynolds, Toronto Balmy Beach Beachers
C  – Jack Taylor, Toronto Balmy Beach Beachers
G – Bill Irwin, Toronto Balmy Beach Beachers
G – George Hornig, McGill University
T – Tommy Burns, Montreal Indians
T – Andy Anton, McGill University

1937 Ontario Rugby Football Union All-Stars
NOTE: During this time most players played both ways, so the All-Star selections do not distinguish between some offensive and defensive positions.

QB – Alex Hayes, Sarnia Imperials
FW – Ormond Beach, Sarnia Imperials
HB – Ab Box, Toronto Balmy Beach Beachers
HB – Herb Moores, Toronto Balmy Beach Beachers
DB – Hugh Sterling, Sarnia Imperials
E  – Syd Reynolds, Toronto Balmy Beach Beachers
E  – Danny Daniels, Toronto Balmy Beach Beachers
C  – Jack Taylor, Toronto Balmy Beach Beachers
G – Pat Bulter, Sarnia Imperials
G – Bill Irwin, Toronto Balmy Beach Beachers
T – Mike Clawson, Sarnia Imperials
T – Cliff Parson, Sarnia Imperials

1937 Canadian Football Awards
 Jeff Russel Memorial Trophy (IRFU MVP) – Teddy Morris (FW), Toronto Argonauts
 Imperial Oil Trophy (ORFU MVP) - Ormond Beach - Sarnia Imperials

References

 
Canadian Football League seasons
Grey Cups hosted in Toronto